Boris Kitka (born 16 August 1970) is a Slovak football player and football manager.
He played for Slovan Bratislava as well as rivals of Spartak Trnava. He managed Slovan Bratislava and Slovakia U21. As an assistant, he cooperates with Vladimír Weiss for over a decade.

Kitka also occasionally appears as a expert analyst for Slovak public broadcaster RTVS during national team fixtures and major tournaments, such as UEFA Euro 2020.

References

External links

1970 births
Living people
Slovak footballers
Slovak football managers
ŠK Slovan Bratislava managers
Slovak Super Liga managers
Slovakia national under-21 football team managers
ŠK Slovan Bratislava players
FC Spartak Trnava players
FK Inter Bratislava players
SV Ried players
Austrian Football Bundesliga players
Slovak Super Liga players
Expatriate footballers in Austria
Slovak expatriate sportspeople in Austria
Expatriate footballers in Kazakhstan
Slovak expatriate sportspeople in Kazakhstan
Association football defenders
Slovak television people